The 1987–88 season is FC Barcelona's 89th season in existence and the club's 57th consecutive season in the top flight of Spanish football.

Squad

Competitions

La Liga

League table

Results by round

Matches

Copa del Rey

Round of 32

Eightfinals

Quarterfinals

Semifinals

Final

UEFA Cup

First round

Round of 32

Eightfinals

Quarterfinals

Friendlies

Statistics

Players statistics

External links

webdelcule.com

FC Barcelona seasons
Barcelona